Papilio karna is a species of swallowtail butterfly from the genus Papilio that is found in Java, Sumatra, Borneo and the Philippines.

Subspecies
Papilio karna karna (western Java: Mount Gede)
Papilio karna discordia de Nicéville, [1893] (north-eastern Sumatra)
Papilio karna carnatus Rothschild, 1895 (northern Borneo)
Papilio karna irauana Jumalon, 1975 (Philippines: Palawan)

References

Other sources
Erich Bauer and Thomas Frankenbach, 1998 Schmetterlinge der Erde, Butterflies of the world Part I (1), Papilionidae Papilionidae I: Papilio, Subgenus Achillides, Bhutanitis, Teinopalpus. Edited by  Erich Bauer and Thomas Frankenbach.  Keltern : Goecke & Evers ; Canterbury : Hillside Books 

karna
Butterflies described in 1864
Butterflies of Borneo
Butterflies of Java
Butterflies of Asia
Taxa named by Baron Cajetan von Felder
Taxa named by Rudolf Felder